Georgi Petrov (born 25 February 1974) is a former Bulgarian footballer. His first club was PFC Pirin Gotse Delchev.

Awards
 Champion of Bulgaria 2004 (with PFC Lokomotiv Plovdiv)

External links

1974 births
Living people
Bulgarian footballers
Bulgaria international footballers
PFC Levski Sofia players
Botev Plovdiv players
PFC Velbazhd Kyustendil players
PFC Lokomotiv Plovdiv players
First Professional Football League (Bulgaria) players
PFC Pirin Gotse Delchev players
OFC Pirin Blagoevgrad players
Association football defenders
People from Gotse Delchev
Sportspeople from Blagoevgrad Province